Seven-time defending champion Rafael Nadal defeated Novak Djokovic in the final, 6–3, 6–1 to win the singles tennis title at the 2012 Monte-Carlo Masters. Nadal became the first man in the Open Era to win a tournament eight consecutive times. He did not lose a single set in the entire tournament.

Seeds
Top 8 seeds received a bye into the second round.

 Novak Djokovic (final)
 Rafael Nadal (champion)
 Andy Murray (quarterfinals)
 Jo-Wilfried Tsonga (quarterfinals)
 David Ferrer (second round)
 Tomáš Berdych (semifinals)
 Janko Tipsarević (third round)
 Nicolás Almagro (third round)
 Gilles Simon (semifinals)
 Feliciano López (first round)
 Juan Mónaco (first round, retired because of a right ankle injury)
 Kei Nishikori (third round)
 Fernando Verdasco (third round)
 Florian Mayer (first round)
 Jürgen Melzer (second round)
 Alexandr Dolgopolov (third round)

Draw

Finals

Top half

Section 1

Section 2

Bottom half

Section 3

Section 4

Qualifying

Seeds

Qualifiers

Draw

First qualifier

Second qualifier

Third qualifier

Fourth qualifier

Fifth qualifier

Sixth qualifier

Seventh qualifier

External links
 Main draw
 Qualifying draw

Monte-Carlo Rolex Masters - Singles
2012 Monte-Carlo Rolex Masters